Boshgaz (also Romanized as Bāshgaz; also known as Bazqush and Bocgaz) is a village in Mud Rural District, Mud District, Sarbisheh County, South Khorasan Province, Iran. At the 2006 census, its population was 421, in 107 families.

References 

Populated places in Sarbisheh County